Matthias Müller (born 9 June 1953) is a German businessman who was the chief executive officer (CEO) of Volkswagen AG from 25 September 2015 to 12 April 2018. He had been the CEO of its subsidiary, Porsche, since 2010 and has been Member of the executive board of Porsche Automobil Holding SE since 2010.

Early life and education
Matthias Müller was born on 9 June 1953, in Limbach-Oberfrohna, East Germany. His family moved to West Germany in 1955, and he grew up in Bavaria. After graduating from school in Ingolstadt, Müller started an apprenticeship as a toolmaker at Audi, which he completed in 1977. He subsequently studied computer engineering science at the Munich University of Applied Sciences.

Career
Müller returned to Audi, taking a junior management position in the IT department in 1984. After joining the planning department in 1993, Müller became product manager for the Audi A3; two years later he was given overall responsibility for product management at Audi.

After Martin Winterkorn took over the management of Audi, Müller was appointed coordinator of the Audi and Lamborghini model lines in 2002. In 2007 Winterkorn became boss of the VW Group and appointed Müller as general representative, later making him head of VW's product strategy, in control of all group brands.

In October 2010, he was appointed CEO of Porsche AG.  In February 2014 he became chief information officer of Porsche Automobil Holding SE.

On 25 September 2015, he was appointed CEO of Volkswagen AG. He was ousted of his position as CEO of Volkswagen on April 12, 2018. Dr. Herbert Diess assumed Müller's position as CEO of Volkswagen AG.

References

External links

Bio at Porsche AG

1953 births
Living people
Engineers from Chemnitz
German chief executives
Audi people
Volkswagen Group executives
Porsche people
Chief executives in the automobile industry
Chief information officers